Ye Zheyun is a Chinese businessman who was accused of being involved in a Belgian football corruption and betting scandal that took place in 2005. It was alleged that several teams and/or players received money from Ye to influence match results, so corrupt bookmakers could be certain of a gambling profit.

Background information
Teams mentioned in the scandal are Lierse, La Louvière, Sint-Truiden, Mons, Geel and also Germinal Beerschot. Ye always appeared at teams with financial problems, except for Beerschot, who had at that time a crucial match against AEC Mons who were on the verge of relegation. The insinuations about fixed results started after a few matches, on which were heavily betted, with strange events and/or results. Such as e.g. Lierse starting with a reserve team twice unexpectedly. Ye had also been the owner of Finnish team AC Allianssi, due to bankruptcy a now defunct club who also seemed to experience from some strange match events at the end of their existence. Police investigated the case, but found insufficient evidence.

Disappearance
Ye mostly worked together with Pietro Allatta and Olivier Suray. Police arrested both, but Allatta and Suray were released after interrogation. In March 2006, the Belgian Justice Department ordered an international arrest warrant against Ye. It is unknown where he currently remains. His lawyer told French sports paper L'Équipe that Ye denied all accusations and that he was residing somewhere in China.

See also 
List of fugitives from justice who disappeared

References

External links
"Bribery scandal in Belgium" at Xtreme Football Fans Forum
Humo files: Zheyun Ye 

2005–06 in Belgian football
Chinese businesspeople
Fugitives
Fugitives wanted by Belgium
Fugitives wanted on bribery charges
Living people
Sportspeople involved in betting scandals
Sports scandals in China
Sports scandals in Belgium
Year of birth missing (living people)